Bernard Lorjou (9 September 1908 – 26 January 1986) was a French painter of Expressionism and a founding member of the anti-abstract art Group "L'homme Témoin".

Life and work
Lorjou was born in Blois, in the Loire et Cher department of France.  Born to an impoverished family just before World War I, Lorjou was to receive the bulk of his education, as he put it, “in the streets.” At the age of 13, with his desire to learn to paint, he lft his home for Paris.  There, Lorjou lived through early years of hardship and often found himself sleeping in metro and train stations while working without pay as an errand boy for a printing house.  He eventually found a position as a silk designer where he met his future wife Yvonne Mottet, also an artist and painter.  Lorjou found success as a silk designer.  Over the next 30 years, his designs not only adorned the bodies of many of the world's most prominent women but also provided him an income that allowed him to paint on a full-time basis.

Lorjou exhibited for the first time at the Salon des Indépendents in 1928.  During travels through Spain in 1931, he was struck by the expressive strong styles of the artists El Greco, Velasquez, and most of all Goya.  Inspired by Goya, Lorjou began painting socio-political events.  In 1948, he shared the Critic’s Award with Bernard Buffet.  In the same year, Lorjou formed the art group “l’Homme Temoin” with art critic Jean Bouret by declaring that "man is an eater of red meat, fried potatoes, fruit and cheese".  The group banded together in an effort to defend figurative painting against the abstract movement and would eventually attract other painters such as Bernard Buffet, Jean Couty, André Minaux, Charazac, and Simone Dat.

Over the next 30 years Lorjou’s reputation as a painter became more established.  His work and style went through a series of transformations, the only constants being the power of his images and the rich precision of his use of vibrant color. Lorjou was supported by prominent art figures like Georges Wildenstein and Domenica Walter, the widow of Paul Guillaume.  Lorjou became known for his extravagant exhibits and combative spirit.  His works were exhibited widely throughout the world, namely in France, the United States, and in Japan.

On 26 January 1986, at the age of 77, Lorjou died from an acute asthma attack at his home in St. Denis sur Loire.

Lorjou’s body of work includes thousands of paintings, a collection wood engravings, ceramic and bronze sculptures, lithographs, illustrated books, socially oriented posters, stained glass windows, and murals.

Theme exhibitions (selection)

Commissioned works

See also
 Un Regard de Lumière, Lorjou, a 1983 film by Olivier Girard

References

artnet
Bernard Lorjou on the-artists.org
Gerard, Georges.  Lorjou, le peintre du siecle (Collection Les Temoins de l'histoire). France: Publisud, 1989.
Crespelle, J.P. “LORJOU, Dernier Grand de la Butte.” Montmartre Vivant. Ed. Hachette. France: Hachette, 1964. 249-273.

External links
 Bernard Lorjou Official Website

20th-century French painters
20th-century French male artists
French male painters
1908 births
1986 deaths